Parliamentary elections were held in Kiribati on 30 December 2015, with a second round of voting for 25 seats on 7 January 2016. The result was a victory for the Pillars of Truth party, which won 26 of the 46 seats.

Electoral system
The 46 member of the House of Assembly are elected by three methods; 44 are elected in 23 single- and multi-member constituencies using a modified two-round system. Voters had as many votes to cast as the number of seats in their constituencies, and a candidate was elected in the first round if they received more than 50% of the ballots cast. Where not all seats were filled, a second round was held with the number of candidates being equal to the number of remaining seats plus two. A tie in the second round would have resulted in a third round of voting. The other two members of the House consisted of one seat elected by the Rabi Council of Leaders, and the Attorney General, as an ex-officio member until the Change of Constitution in October 2016. The Speaker elected after the elections from outside the House of Assembly, is not an MP.

Results
Of the 44 seats, 19 were won in the first round and 25 went to a run-off. In the first round, incumbent minister Tom Murdoch lost his seat. In the run-off, Labour Minister Martin Moreti and Environment Minister Tiarite Kwong lost their seats. Former President Teatao Teannaki also lost his seat on Abaiang. However, former presidents Ieremia Tabai and Teburoro Tito retained their seats.

On Onotoa, Kouraiti Beniato retained his seat, while on Maiana new MPs David Collins and Kaure Baabo were elected; In North Tarawa, two new MPs, Atarake Natara and Emile Schutz, were elected, while Nabuti Mwemwenikarawa, former leader of Maurin Kiribati and candidate for president, lost; on Kiritimati, Kirata Temwamwaka and Jacob Teem were elected; while Uriam Iabeta won her Teraina seat in the Line Islands.

See also
List of members of the 11th Parliament of Kiribati

References

Elections in Kiribati
2015 in Kiribati
Kiribati
2016 in Kiribati
Kiribati
Election and referendum articles with incomplete results
Kiribati
Kiribati